Katja Maarit Lehto (born 14 August 1972) is a Finnish retired ice hockey player. She played with the Finnish national ice hockey team throughout the 1990s and won a bronze medal at the inaugural Olympic women's ice hockey tournament at the 1998 Winter Olympics. With the national team, she also won bronze at the IIHF Women's World Championships in 1999 and 2000, and gold at the 1995 IIHF European Women Championship.

Lehto’s club career was played in the Naisten SM-sarja with KalPa Naiset and JYP Naiset.

References

1972 births
Living people
Sportspeople from Jyväskylä
Finnish women's ice hockey defencemen
Ice hockey players at the 1998 Winter Olympics
Medalists at the 1998 Winter Olympics
Olympic bronze medalists for Finland
Olympic ice hockey players of Finland
Olympic medalists in ice hockey
JYP Jyväskylä Naiset players
JyP HT Naiset players
KalPa Naiset players
20th-century Finnish people